Gromov's compactness theorem can refer to either of two mathematical theorems:

 Gromov's compactness theorem (geometry) stating that certain sets of Riemannian manifolds are relatively compact in the Gromov-Hausdorff metric
 Gromov's compactness theorem (topology) on the existence of limits of sequences of pseudoholomorphic curves